The 2013–14 Czech 1.liga season was the 20th season of the Czech 1.liga, the second level of ice hockey in the Czech Republic. 14 teams participated in the league, and BK Mladá Boleslav and HC Olomouc qualified for the qualification round of the Czech Extraliga for the second time in a row. Both of the teams were successful at qualifying for the 2014–15 Czech Extraliga season.

Regular season

Playoffs

BK Mladá Boleslav and HC Olomouc proceeded directly to the qualification round of the Czech Extraliga after winning their semifinal series. Both teams won qualification, and Rytíři Kladno and Piráti Chomutov were relegated to the First Liga from Extraliga

Relegation round

External links 
 Hokej.cz

3
Czech 1. Liga seasons
Czech